Mazkeret Batya railway station is an Israel Railways passenger station situated on the railway to Beersheba. It is located north of Route 411 and south of the Shlosha stream, near the future industrial area of Mazkeret Batya, whose plans were approved in 2015.

The tender for the station was published in March 2016. On 27 December 2016 the Minister of Transportation, Yisrael Katz laid the cornerstone for the station. According to the ministry of transportation the station was to be inaugurated during October 2018, but this was delayed to 2019. The cost of building the station was approximately 20 million NIS and it opened on 30 May 2019.

The station has a size of 550 sq. meters and 320 parking spaces, 9 handicapped spaces and 7 bus bays. It has two 300 meter long side platforms with an underground passage to reach them, serving a total of two tracks. Each of the side platforms can be converted to an island platform in the future, allowing the station to serve a total of four tracks.

Trains on the Tel Aviv – Lod – Be'er Sheva line stop at this station.

References

Railway stations in Israel
Railway stations in Central District (Israel)